Adobe BrowserLab was a service that enabled cross-browser testing by producing screenshots of websites from various web browsers across different platforms (Windows and OS X are currently supported). Screenshots could be compared side-by-side or overlaid upon one another, with diagnostic tools to help discover cross-browser differences.

The service could access dynamic pages across the web, or local content via Firebug or Adobe Dreamweaver CS5. The BrowserLab for Firebug extension allowed Firebug users to preview their page (live URL, or local edited source) in BrowserLab. This workflow allows using BrowserLab with site content that is behind a firewall or not yet published publicly on the Internet.

BrowserLab was updated frequently during its lifespan, with regular posts on the Adobe BrowserLab Team Blog.

History 
In 2006, a team of Chicago-based designers and developers, Dean Vukas, Josh Hatwich, Ted Billups and Charles Stevenson conceived and invented MeerMeer, a web site testing tool for web developers and designers. The MeerMeer SaaS application and patent was sold to Adobe Systems, Inc. in December 2007 and was released worldwide under the new name, Adobe BrowserLab.

On March 13, 2013, BrowserLab was shut down.

See also 
 Adobe Dreamweaver

External links 
 Adobe BrowserLab official site

References 

BrowserLab
Web development software
BrowserLab